"Barso Re" is a song from soundtrack of the 2007 Indian Hindi biographical film  Guru, directed by Mani Ratnam. The song was composed by A. R. Rahman with lyrics provided by Gulzar and sung by Shreya Ghoshal, featuring Uday Mazumdar. The song was well received, with Shreya Ghoshal receiving many accolades.

Picturization
The song is picturized on Sujata (Aishwarya Rai), and appears when she decides to leave her parents to elope with her boyfriend. In later part Sujata finally leaves her parents.

The video of the song is shot in Kerala where the opening scene of majestic Athirapilly waterfalls is shown and at the villages of Karnataka, the Rayagopura at Melukote temple, and a few more. According to some sources, the majority of rain used in the song is natural as it was monsoon season, hence little artificial rain was needed.

Choreography
The dance in the video was choreographed by Saroj Khan, for which she won her eighth Filmfare Best Choreography Award. The dance shows Sujata dancing like one would when it rains. Aishwarya is also seen dancing atop a large rock with water below, amidst the thunderstorm.

Awards
Filmfare Awards
Won, Best Female Playback – Shreya Ghoshal
Won, Best Choreography - Saroj Khan

Star Screen Awards
Won, Best Female Playback – Shreya Ghoshal

IIFA Awards
Won, Best Female Playback – Shreya Ghoshal

Zee Cine Awards
Won, Best Female Playback – Shreya Ghoshal

See also
Guru
Guru (soundtrack)

References

2007 songs
Indian songs
Hindi film songs
Songs with music by A. R. Rahman
Songs with lyrics by Gulzar
Shreya Ghoshal songs